The 2012 Pekao Szczecin Open was a professional tennis tournament played on clay courts. It was the 20th edition of the tournament which was part of the 2012 ATP Challenger Tour. It took place in Szczecin, Poland between 17 and 23 September 2012.

Singles main draw entrants

Seeds

 1 Rankings are as of September 10, 2012.

Other entrants
The following players received wildcards into the singles main draw:
  Marcin Gawron
  Arkadiusz Kocyla
  Grzegorz Panfil
  Michał Przysiężny

The following players received entry from the qualifying draw:
  Guido Andreozzi
  Piotr Gadomski
  Alexander Rumyantsev
  Artem Smirnov

Champions

Singles

 Victor Hănescu def.  Iñigo Cervantes Huegun, 6–4, 7–5

Doubles

 Andre Begemann /  Martin Emmrich def.  Tomasz Bednarek /  Mateusz Kowalczyk, 3–6, 6–1, [10–3]

External links
Official Website

Pekao Szczecin Open
Pekao Szczecin Open
Pekao